Rodney Wilson may refer to:
 Rodney Wilson (economist) (born 1946), British economist
 Rodney Wilson (museum director) (1945–2013), New Zealand art historian and museum professional